Aquanautic is the second album by the Swedish alternative rock band The Wannadies. It was released in 1992 and reached number thirty-nine on the Swedish Albums Chart. Aquanautic includes the singles "Things That I Would Love To Have Undone", "So Happy Now" and the EP; "Cherry Man". Receiving positive reviews the album was originally released as a CD in October 1992. The artwork was designed by Freq Form with photography by Peter Gehrke, Ake E:son Lindman and Lena Granefelt.

Reception

Aquanautic received positive reviews from the majority of critics. Jason Damas writing for Allmusic heaps praise on the album describing it as "much louder and guitar-oriented" and displaying a "very major leap in songwriting from the first album". Damas concludes remarking that Aquanautic "marked the beginning of the band's climb to success outside of Sweden, and it is also the disc where they found their signature sound".

Track listing

Personnel
The Wannadies are
 Pär Wiksten
 Stefan Schönfeldt
 Fredrik Schönfeldt
 Gunnar Karlsson
 Christina Bergmark
 Björn Segnestam-Malmqvist

Additional musicians, technical and visual
 Michael Ilbert – Maracas ("Everything's True), Tambourine ("December Days"), Percussion ("Something To Tell")
 Metal Mike – Maracas and Tambourine ("Cherry Man"), Percussion ("So Happy Now")
 Michael Ilbert – Producer, Recorded By
 Michael Ilbert, Peter Mark – Mixing
 The Wannadies – Music, Lyrics
 Freq Form – Artwork
 Peter Gehrke – Photography [Group]
 Ake E:son Lindman – Photography [Pages 3&6]
 Lena Granefelt – Photography [Pages 5&9]
 Bisse – Photography Assistant

References

The Wannadies albums
1992 albums